Women in Macau, as described by Candice Chio Ngan Ieng, president of the Macau Women's General Association (AGMM), in 2010 are currently defining themselves as capable and irreplaceable powers to Macau's modern-day civilization.

Domestic Life

Education 
According to a fact sheet produced by Mariette Bolina, child rearing is often considered the role of women, but later, more women will decide to pursue an education. The improvement of the level of education received by women in Macau is often attributed to the overall improvement of quality of Macau's education system and the overall improvement of women's educational awareness. from 1970 to 2007, due to the changing status of women in Macau's society and more people pursuing a greater level of education, the number of female university students increased from 10.8 million to 77.4 million. However, there still exists illiteracy among Macanese women. It is theorised that by discarding Traditionalist attitudes and encouraging more women to pursue an education, Macau could eliminate this illiteracy. In addition, the gender gap between Macanese men and women can be eliminated through the pursuit of education.

Career 
In the early 1990s, women in Macau became an indispensable force in the labor market. The 1991 edition of the Employment Survey, using data from Macau's Statistic and Census Bureau, estimated that the labor participation rate of women was 44.35%, the rate would later increase to 45.32% in 1996. The income level of employed women has increased since the 1990s, reducing the income gap between men and women. However, the proportion of women as low income households remains higher than that of men, while the proportion of women as high income households is much smaller. In 1994, Women with an average monthly income of less than 1000 yuan accounted for 78.47% of the female population, women with monthly income of between 1,501 to 2,000 yuan accounted for 84.58% of the female population, and women with a monthly income of 2,001 to 2,500 yuan accounted for 70.12% of the female population, while women with an average monthly income of more than 2,500 yuan accounted for only 28.1% of the female population, while men accounted for 71.86%. This shows that there still exists a major disparity between men and women's earnings in Macau.

Gender Equality 
According to a survey conducted by Xinxin Chen, most Macanese women believe that their status in the family is equal to men but less so in greater society, younger women felt as though their social status was more egalitarian. This suggests that Traditionalist attitudes are still somewhat persistent in Macanese society but is waning in more familial settings and younger generations.

Family life 
According to a survey from the Macau women's database, The respondents are mostly dissatisfied in communication with their families, also the living environment, and getting alone with husband plus children's education. Their life experiences is also vary on age. From age 18-30, communication with families and economic situation are mostly dissatisfied by the respondents. For age 31-55, children education and also the economic status are the things respondents worried about, after age 56, respondents are more concern about the communication with families. In general, the happiness of family life in Macau women will change according to different ages, income status and marital status.

Political Participation 
While under the colonial Portuguese, the affairs of Macau were all managed by Portuguese politicians. Chinese inhabitants rarely had adequate representation in local politics. The opportunities for women to participate in political affairs were even more so. After the period of colonization, the Special Administrative Region's Government enacted legislation to eliminate discrimination against women. In addition, various bureaus and departments have been founded to help advance and protect the equality of women and their welfare. This is exemplified by Article 38 of the Basic Law of the Macao Special Administrative Region of the People's Republic of China  which states:"Women's rights and interests are protected by the Macao Special Administrative Region."

Florinda Chan 

Florinda Chan became a noteworthy Feminist icon in Macau after she became the Chief of Administrator of Macau at age 45.

Sex trafficking

Sex trafficking in Macau remains a commonplace practice and contentious concern. Women and girls, both local and foreign, are forced into prostitution in brothels, homes, and businesses in the city.

See also
Macau women's national ice hockey team
Human trafficking in Macau

References

Further reading
Pina-Cabral, João de. Between China and Europe: Person, Culture, and Emotion in Macao, Volume 74 of London School of Economics Monographs on Social Anthropology, Berg Publishers, 2002, p. 174 (256 pages),

External links

 
History of Macau
 
Macau